Gerry Cassan (born 5 December 1954) is a Canadian speed skater. He competed in the men's 500 metres event at the 1972 Winter Olympics.

References

1954 births
Living people
Canadian male speed skaters
Olympic speed skaters of Canada
Speed skaters at the 1972 Winter Olympics
Sportspeople from Ottawa